Sir Henry Grattan Bushe,  (1 January 1886 – 23 August 1961) was a British colonial governor and lawyer.

Bushe was born in Trinidad, the son of John Scott Bushe, the Colonial Secretary of Trinidad. An ancestor was the Irish judge Sir Charles Kendal Bushe. Bushe was educated at Aysgarth School and Denstone College. He was called to the bar in 1909, and joined the chambers of Sir Edward Marshall Hall. In 1917, he joined the Colonial Office, becoming Legal Adviser to the Colonial Office and the Dominions Office in 1931.

In 1941, Bushe was appointed Governor of Barbados. The promotion was said to be without precedent, as Bushe was the first colonial governor to be appointed from the Colonial Office legal staff. He retired in 1946.

References

External links 

 

1868 births
1961 deaths
Governors of Barbados
People educated at Aysgarth School
People educated at Denstone College
British barristers
Knights Commander of the Order of St Michael and St George
Companions of the Order of the Bath
Civil servants in the Colonial Office
20th-century British lawyers